Vampire Hunter D is a series of novels by Hideyuki Kikuchi and Yoshitaka Amano, the novels' title character, and a related media franchise.

Vampire Hunter D may also refer to:

 Vampire Hunter D (novel), the 1983 first novel in the series
 Vampire Hunter D (1985 film), an adaptation of the 1983 novel
 Vampire Hunter D (soundtrack), a soundtrack album from the film
 Vampire Hunter D (video game), a 1999 game adapted from the novels and films
 Hideyuki Kikuchi's Vampire Hunter D, a 2007–2014 manga series adapted from the novels